Jón Kristjánsson (17 May 1920 – 16 February 1996) was an Icelandic cross-country skier who competed in the 1950s. At the 1952 Winter Olympics in Oslo, he finished 45th in the 18 km event and 30th in the 50 km event. He also competed at the 1956 Winter Olympics.

References

External links
 18 km Olympic cross country results: 1948-52
 Olympic 50 km cross country skiing results: 1948-64

1920 births
1996 deaths
Jon Kristjansson
Cross-country skiers at the 1952 Winter Olympics
Cross-country skiers at the 1956 Winter Olympics
Jon Kristjansson
20th-century Icelandic people